Prithvirajsing Roopun GCSK (born 24 May 1959), also known as Pradeep Singh Roopun, is a Mauritian politician serving as the seventh president of Mauritius since 2019.

Early life, education, career and family life
Prithvirajsing Roopun was born in an Indian Arya Samaji Hindu family and grew up in Morcellement St. Jean, a suburb of Quatre Bornes. He attended secondary school at New Eton College in Rose Hill and worked as a mathematics teacher at Eden College. He has been qualified and admitted to practice as an attorney at law since 1986. Roopun is a holder of a master's degree in international business law (LLM) from the University of Central Lancashire.

Since 1989 and for over fifteen years, Roopun has been a member of the board of examiner of the Council of Legal Education. He also lectured at the Faculty of Law of the University of Mauritius.

He is married to Sayukta Roopun. Their daughters are Divya, Jyotsna, Adishta and Vedisha.

Political career
Roopun joined politics in 1983 and stood as candidate for the first time in 1995. He was elected in constituency No. 14, Savanne and Black River in the 2000 general election to serve the Legislative Assembly as deputy chief government whip until 2004. In 2005, he was appointed as minister of local government and solid waste management.

Roopun was elected in constituency No. 9, Flacq and Bon Accueil in the 2010 general election. He was the deputy speaker of the National Assembly of Mauritius between 2010 and 2012.

He also represented Mauritius as a member of the Pan African Parliament from 2010 to 2014, where he was deputy chair of the Committee of Transport, Industry, Communications, Energy, Science and Technology.

From December 2014 to January 2017, Roopun served as minister of social integration and economic empowerment having as major responsibility the eradication of extreme poverty and the empowerment of the vulnerable groups. During his tenure, a Marshall Plan Against Poverty was elaborated with the support of the UNDP; and a scheme providing for a subsistence allowance for families living in extreme poverty was introduced.

From January 2017 to November 2019, he served as minister of arts and culture. During his tenure, he chaired the UNESCO 13th Session of the Intergovernmental Committee for the Safeguarding of the Intangible Cultural Heritage during which reggae music of Jamaica was inscribed on the representative list.

Nomination as president of Mauritius
Although he was not a candidate at the 2019 general election, soon after he was nominated as the seventh president of Mauritius by the National Assembly on 2 December 2019 and was sworn in on the same day. On his assumption as President of the Republic of Mauritius, he received the award of Grand Commander of the Order of the Star and Key of the Indian Ocean by virtue of the National Awards Act 1993 Section (6) 1

Controversies
On 11 February 2020 one of the motorcycle policemen, who generally accompany the president's limousine and ensure its clear passage through congested traffic, was seriously hurt when he came off his motorcycle at high speed and in wet weather at Trianon. This prompted a debate about the unnecessary risks that police have to bear in order for politicians to travel on Mauritian roads.

At the end of February 2020 the Indian press reported that Roopun and his family were stopped for carrying excess baggage in Varanasi, India when he was on a private trip. Roopun was asked to pay the extra charges by the Air India staff at the Lal Bahadur Shastri Airport before proceeding with his visit. However following the intervention of two affluent figures the Air India staff had to waive the extra charges.

Awards and decorations
:
 Grand Commander of the Order of the Star and Key of the Indian Ocean (GCSK) (2019)

References 

1959 births
Living people
Government ministers of Mauritius
Militant Socialist Movement politicians
Presidents of Mauritius
People from Plaines Wilhems District
Mauritian Hindus
Mauritian politicians of Indian descent